Silent Library is an American television game show which aired on MTV from June 15, 2009 to May 13, 2011. The series is based on one of the segments in the popular Japanese variety show Downtown no Gaki no Tsukai ya Arahende!!

The series was renewed for a 20-episode second season, which premiered on January 11, 2010 and featured celebrities such as the cast of Jersey Shore, All Time Low, Jim Jones, We The Kings, Ron Jeremy, Naked Cowboy, Asher Roth, This or the Apocalypse, Forever the Sickest Kids, Jessie James, Aubrey O'Day, and Justin Bieber competing as contestants and appearing in humiliating punishment challenges.

The series' third season premiered on June 28, 2010. The bands Patent Pending, All Time Low, Stereo Skyline, Hey Monday, Anarbor, NeverShoutNever, Honor Society, New Boyz and Iyaz have appeared as contestants, as did members of the New York Giants NFL team and the cast of the MTV original series The Hard Times of R.J. Berger.

The fourth season premiered on March 28, 2011. The cast of Jersey Shore, The Ready Set, Judah Friedlander, Jimmy Fallon & The Roots, players from the New York Giants, 3OH!3, and Superstars from the WWE all competed as contestants.

MTV canceled the show on November 9, 2011.

Play

The set is constructed to resemble a typical public library. A team of six players sits at a study table, three on each side, with host Zero Kazama sitting nearby at the circulation desk next to the entrance. Six cards are placed facedown on the table, and each player picks one and flips it over. Typically, five of the cards are green and marked "Safe"; the sixth, which is yellow and marked with a black skull and crossbones, means that its holder must endure a bizarre "punishment" challenge. In some cases during the second season, five of the six cards show the skull and crossbones, leaving only one player safe.

While the challenge is in progress, an on-screen gauge indicates the amount of noise made by the team. If the noise level goes into the gauge's red zone at any time, the team automatically loses the challenge. Only afterward does Kazama inform the team of their success or failure in this respect, as they are unaware of the gauge's readings. The team will also lose if they fail to achieve the objective of the challenge.

The game is played in four rounds, with three challenges in each of the first three rounds and one in the fourth. Successful challenges in rounds 1, 2, 3, and 4 earn $300, $400, $800, and $1,000 for the team, respectively (for the team's chosen charity in a celebrity episode). All winnings are split equally among the six players, and Kazama pays them off as they exit the library at the end of the show. A disclaimer during the end credits states that the team may have played additional challenges that were not aired, and thus may have won more money than the total shown at the end of the episode.

Episodes

References

Footnotes

External links
 

American television series based on Japanese television series
2009 American television series debuts
2011 American television series endings
2000s American comedy game shows
2010s American comedy game shows
English-language television shows
MTV game shows
MTV weekday shows
Television game shows with incorrect disambiguation